The thirtieth season of the Case Closed anime was directed by Yasuichirō Yamamoto and Nobuharu Kamanaka (since episode 975), and produced by TMS Entertainment and Yomiuri Telecasting Corporation. The series is based on Gosho Aoyama's Case Closed manga series. In Japan, the series is titled  but was changed due to legal issues with the title Detective Conan. The series focuses on the adventures of teenage detective Shinichi Kudo who was turned into a child by a poison called APTX 4869, but continues working as a detective under the alias Conan Edogawa.

The episodes use seven pieces of theme music: three openings and four endings.

The first opening theme is ANSWER by Only this time used for episodes 941 (season 29) - 964.

The first ending theme is Sissy Sky by Airi Miyakawa used for episodes 952 (season 29) - 964.

The third opening theme is JUST BELIEVE YOU by all at once used for episodes 983 - 999.

The fourth ending theme is Reboot by Airi Miyakawa used for episodes 993 - 1015 (season 31).

The season aired between November 23, 2019 and February 27, 2021 on Nippon Television Network System in Japan. The season was later collected and released in ten DVD compilations by Shogakukan between February 25, 2022 and November 25, 2022, in Japan. Crunchyroll began simulcasting the series in October 2014, starting with episode 754.

In February 2023, episodes of the anime appeared on Tubi with an English dub, starting at #965. This is the first time since 2010 that any episodes of the main anime series have been dubbed and released in English.



Episode list

Notes

References

Season 30
2019 Japanese television seasons
2020 Japanese television seasons
2021 Japanese television seasons
Anime postponed due to the COVID-19 pandemic
Anime productions suspended due to the COVID-19 pandemic